Cappadocian refers to someone or something from Cappadocia, a region in Asia Minor (Anatolia), in modern Turkey.

Cappadocian can also refer to:
 Cappadocian Greek, a dialect of the Greek language, formerly spoken in Cappadocia
 Cappadocian Fathers, three prominent ancient Christian writers from Cappadocia:
 Basil of Caesarea ( – 379)
 Gregory of Nyssa ( – )
 Gregory of Nazianzus ( – )
 Cappadocian calendar, a calendar formerly used in Cappadocia, derived from the Persian Zoroastrian calendar
 Saint Arsenios the Cappadocian (1840-1924)

See also
 Cappadocia (disambiguation)